Body to Body is the second studio album by Belgian dance act Technotronic, released in 1991. It features the singles "Move That Body" and "Work", both featuring singer Reggie.

Track listing
 "Move That Body" (Jo Bogaert, Réjane Magloire)
 "Work" (Bogaert, Patrick De Meyer, Magloire)
 "Release Yourself" (Bogaert, De Meyer, Magloire)
 "Cold Chillin'" (Bogaert, Lucien Foort, Oliver Abbeloos, De Meyer)
 "Voices" (Bogaert)
 "Money Makes the World Go Round" (Bogaert, Magloire)
 "Gimmie the One" (Bogaert, De Meyer, Magloire)
 "Yeh-Yeah" (Bogaert)
 "Body to Body" (Bogaert, Foort, Abbeloos)
 "Get It Started" (Bogaert, Magloire)
 "Bogaert's Breakfast" (Bogaert)

Personnel
 Jo Bogaert – producer  
 Michel Dierickx – engineer, mixing
 Reggie – vocals on tracks 1-4, 6, 7 and 10
 Riv – vocals on track 9, co-vocals on track 4
 Colt 45 – rap on tracks 4 and 9

Charts

References

External links
Body to Body at Discogs

1991 albums
Technotronic albums